The Tsoo-Yess River, sometimes called the Sooes River, is a stream on the Olympic Peninsula in the U.S. state of Washington. It originates in the northwestern Olympic Mountains and empties into the Pacific Ocean.  The Makah National Fish Hatchery is located approximately 2 miles upstream and raises a variety of salmonid species.

Course
The Tsoo-Yess River originates in the northwestern portion of Olympic Peninsula and flows generally northwest. Its tributaries include Snag Creek, Shafter Creek, Pilchuck Creek, Thirty Cent Creek, Miller Creek, Grimes Creek, Tyler Creek, and Kallapa Creek. Its lower reach flows through the Makah Reservation. It empties into the Pacific at Tsoo-Yess Beach on Makah Bay, about a mile south of the mouth of the Waatch River.

See also
 List of rivers of Washington

References

Rivers of Washington (state)
Rivers of Clallam County, Washington